Territory is a 1978 Soviet adventure drama film directed by Aleksander Surin based on the novel of the same name by Oleg Kuvaev.

The film tells of the difficult search, exploration and the subsequent discovery of gold deposits in Chukotka in the late 1940s and early 1950s of Dalstroy.

In 2015 a remake was released which was directed by Aleksandr Melnik and starred Konstantin Lavronenko.

Cast
Donatas Banionis — Ilya Nikolaevich Chinkov
Vladimir Letenkov — Sergey Baklakov
Yury Sherstnev — Mongolov
Yevgeny Gerasimov — Zhora Aptratin
Nina Zasukhina — Lydia Makarovna
Viktor Adeev — "Doctor" Gurin
Leonty Polokhov — Kutsenko
Vladimir Lomizov — Salakhov
Dmitry Kuznetsov — "The Little One"
Nikolay Volkov — "The God of Fire"
Valentin Pechnikov — "Kefir"
Mikhail Gluzsky — Sidorchuk
Nikolai Zasukhin — Robykin
Alexander Tavakai — Kyae
Zoya Chowdu — daughter of Chiae Tamara
Elena Melnikova — Lyudochka

References

External links

Soviet adventure drama films
1970s adventure drama films
Mosfilm films
1978 films
1970s Russian-language films
1978 drama films